Ciro Cirillo (February 15, 1921 – July 30, 2017) was an Italian politician and member of the Christian Democracy (DC) political party. He served as the President of the Province of Naples from 1969 to 1975 and the President of Campania from 1979 until 1980. Cirillo oversaw reconstruction efforts in the aftermath of the  earthquake in the Irpinia region, which struck the region on November 23, 1980.

In 1981, Cirillo was kidnapped by the Red Brigade, an Italian paramilitary group, in a case that garnered worldwide attention. He was released on July 25, 1981, following 89 days in captivity and a ransom payment of 1.45 billion lire.

Biography
Cirillo was raised in Torre del Greco. He began his career at the Camera di Commercio, Industria, Agricoltura e Artigianato, or Chamber of Commerce of Naples. He joined the Christian Democratic party (DC) and served as the DC's Naples provincial party secretary during the 1960s. Cirillo rose to become a key figure of the regional DC and a political ally of Antonio Gava.

He served as the President of the Province of Naples from 1969 until 1975. In 1979, Cirillo was elected President of Campania, a position he held from 1979 to 1980. He then became the regional councilor of public works and chairman of the commission which oversaw the regions recovery efforts following the Irpinia earthquake in November 1980.

Kidnapping

On April 27, 1981, Cirllo was kidnapped from his home in Torre del Greco by five members of the Red Brigade. During the kidnapping, Cirillo's police escort, Giovanni Senanzi, and his chauffeur, Mario Cancello, were killed in a shoot out between the Red Brigade and the police, while his secretary suffered leg wounds.

Cirillo was held captive by the Red Brigade for 89 days. While Cirillo's kidnapping drew worldwide headlines, many the events during this time period remain a mystery to the present day. Cirillo was finally released on July 25, 1981, following a controversial ransom payment by the Christian Democrats of 1.45 billion lire (the equivalent of 748,000 euros in 2017). The ransom proved contentious, as the DC had previously refused payment for the release of Prime Minister Aldo Moro, who was kidnapped and killed by the Red Brigade in 1978 following 55 days of captivity.

In 2000, Cirillo told La Repubblica that he had written a letter with his version of the kidnapping, to be released by his lawyer after his death. However, he later retracted the letter's existence, telling Il Mattino newspaper that, "It was a bluff. There was a period where I was harassed by journalists. Two Tuscan journalists stood out...I invented a story of a secret account to brush them off." Cirillo, in another interview in 2006, also expressed frustration at the DC party, which had asked him to leave office soon after his release by his kidnappers in 1981.

Ciro Cirillo, who was married with children, died on July 30, 2017, at the age of 96. His funeral was held at the Carmelitani Scalzi church in Torre del Greco on July 31, 2017.

References

1921 births
2017 deaths
Presidents of Campania
Presidents of the Province of Naples
Christian Democracy (Italy) politicians
People from Torre del Greco